Free Fall is a 2014 Hungarian comedy film directed by György Pálfi.

Cast
 Piroska Molnár as Auntie
 Miklós Benedek as Uncle
 Tamás Jordán as Master
 Ferenc Lakos as Student
 Linda Rubesch as Bill
 Gabrielle Jourdan as Student
 Lilla Gogolák as Student
 Krisztina Jankovics as Student
 Edit Kocsisné Birkás as Student
 Géza Kiss as Student
 Marina Gera as Woman
 Csaba Gosztonyi as Husband
 Csaba Györy as Uncle Laci
 Dániel Csengery as Choir leader

Production
Marina Gera explained that when she talked with György Pálfi on the phone, the director was in no hurry to tell her why the role would be difficult. "Only at the end did he tell me that it's time for the bad news: you have to play it completely naked. But I really liked the idea, I thought it was really nice. And I said, 'Yeah, sure.'"

Awards
The film won the Special Jury Prize at the 49th Karlovy Vary International Film Festival, where Pálfi also won the Best Director Award.

References

External links 

2014 comedy films
Hungarian comedy films